Sau Lan Wu (Chinese: 吳秀蘭; born Hong Kong in the early 1940s) is a Chinese American particle physicist and the Enrico Fermi Distinguished Professor of Physics at the University of Wisconsin-Madison. She made important contributions towards the discovery of the J/psi particle, which provided experimental evidence for the existence of the charm quark, and the gluon, the vector boson of the strong force in the Standard Model of physics. Recently, her team located at the European Organization for Nuclear Research (CERN), using data collected at the Large Hadron Collider (LHC), was part of the international effort in the discovery of a boson consistent with the Higgs boson.

Early years
Wu was born in the early 1940s during the Japanese occupation of Hong Kong and went to Vassar College in 1960 with a full scholarship for her undergraduate degree. Initially, she dreamed of becoming a painter, but was inspired by Marie Curie to devote her life to physics. During her years in Vassar, she spent a summer at Brookhaven National Laboratory where the science of particle physics captivated her.

Reminiscence of her years in Vassar, Wu relished the experience and recollected her adjustment to the American society and culture as a difficult but positive one. During her freshman year she and other Vassar students were invited to the White House for an Easter function and met Jacqueline Kennedy, a Vassar alumna (class of 1951). She first experienced racial discrimination when visiting the Supreme Court and was confronted with the choice of "black" or "white" on the door to the restroom.

Academic background
Wu graduated from Vassar College (1963) with a B.A. in Physics. After earning an M.A. (1964) and a Ph.D. (1970) in Physics from Harvard University, she conducted research at MIT, DESY and the University of Wisconsin-Madison, where she is now the Enrico Fermi Distinguished Professor of Physics. Since 1986, Wu has been the Visiting Scientist at CERN conducting research with the LHC as part of the ATLAS team.

Achievements

J/psi
Wu was part of the team led by Samuel C.C. Ting at MIT who discovered the J/psi particle in 1974, for which Ting was awarded the 1976 Nobel Prize in Physics together with Burton Richter. The MIT team where Sau Lan Wu was a postdoc at the time took advantage of the Alternating Gradient Synchrotron accelerator at Brookhaven National Laboratory with high-intensity proton beams, which bombarded a stationary target to produce showers of particles that were detected by particle detectors. They discovered a strong peak in electron-positron Invariant mass at an energy of 3.1 billion electron volts (GeV). This led them to suspect that they had discovered a new stable particle decaying into electron-positron pairs, the same one found by Richter at the SPEAR collider in the SLAC National Accelerator Laboratory.

Gluon
Wu was a key contributor to the discovery of the gluon, a particle that binds — or ‘glues’ — quarks together to form protons and neutrons. For her effort, Wu and her collaborators were awarded the 1995 European Physical Society High Energy and Particle Physics Prize. The smoking gun signature proving the existence of the gluon were the so-called ‘three jet events’ occurring in electron-positron annihilation into a quark-antiquark pair, where an additional gluon is radiated from one of the quarks, creating the third jet. In the late 1970s Wu joined the TASSO Collaboration that operated at the PETRA accelerator at DESY. In 1979 she published a paper with George Zobernig on a method of three-jet analysis in electron-positron annihilation, that was used in the following publication with the entire TASSO Collaboration, regarded as the first evidence of a gluon.

Higgs boson
Wu’s team in Wisconsin was the first American group to join the ATLAS Collaboration at CERN, in 1993, however, her hunt for the Higgs Boson had started earlier at the Large Electron–Positron (LEP) Collider also at CERN. Together with other scientists at LEP they observed a number of Higgs boson candidates, but the observation was not statistically significant and they were only able to set a lower limit on the mass of the hypothetical Higgs Boson particle at 114.4 GeV (at the 95% confidence level). In 2000 CERN had shut the LEP collider so that the Large Hadron Collider could be built in its place.

On July 4, 2012, following the immense efforts of the ATLAS and CMS Collaborations, CERN announced the discovery of a boson consistent with the predicted characters of Higgs boson with a mass of 125 GeV. This was a statistically significant discovery at the level of 5-sigma, a term meaning that the odds it occurred by chance are less than 1 in 3.5 million. This discovery completes the Standard Model of particle physics which explains most of the phenomena in the visible Universe. Wu is credited as a significant contributor to the discovery with her Wisconsin's group work on the two key decay channels that led to the discovery of the Higgs boson, the decay of the Higgs boson into two gamma-rays (H→ɣɣ), and the decay of the Higgs boson into four leptons (H→ZZ*→4ℓ).

PhD Students 
Wu has mentored more than 60 PhD students and several became successful academics themselves.

Honors
Outstanding Junior Investigator Award of U.S. Department of Energy, 1980
Romnes Faculty Award, University of Wisconsin, Madison 1981
Hilldale Professorship, University of Wisconsin, Madison 1991
Fellow, American Physical Society 1992
High Energy and Particle Physics Prize of the European Physical Society 1995, with Paul Söding, Björn Wiik, and Günter Wolf, for the discovery of the gluon.
Fellow, American Academy of Arts and Sciences 1996
Vilas Professorship, University of Wisconsin, Madison 1998
Sau Lan Wu has been featured in several books as an inspiring scientist figure for young students. The books include : A New York Times Best Seller "Women in Science – 50 fearless pioneers who changed the world", "This Little Scientist : A Discovery Primer", "Good Night Stories for Rebel Girls: 100 Immigrant Women Who Changed the World", "How to Be Extraordinary", and "Scientists Alphabet Book by Christi Sperber".
Minor planet 177770 SaulanWu, discovered by astronomers with the Mount Lemmon Survey in 2005, was named in her honor. The official naming citation was published by International Astronomical Union's WG Small Body Nomenclature (WGSBN) bulletin and Minor Planet Center on 23 May 2022.

References

Further reading

External links
Scientific publications of Sau Lan Wu on INSPIRE-HEP

Hong Kong physicists
Particle physicists
Date of birth missing (living people)
Living people
Chinese women physicists
Fellows of the American Academy of Arts and Sciences
Fellows of the American Physical Society
People associated with CERN
Vassar College alumni
Harvard Graduate School of Arts and Sciences alumni
University of Wisconsin–Madison faculty
Hong Kong emigrants to the United States
21st-century American physicists
20th-century American women scientists
21st-century American women scientists
Year of birth missing (living people)
American women academics